Czech Republic–Moldova relations refer to foreign relations between the Czech Republic and Moldova . Moldova has an embassy in Prague.

The new building of the embassy of Moldova in Prague was opened on 2 September 1998 by the Moldovan Prime Minister, Zinaida Greceanîi, and Czech Prime Minister, Mirek Topolanek.

Ștefan Gorda was appointed as the Moldovan Ambassador to the Czech Republic in 2010. In 2016 Vitalie Rusu was appointed as the Ambassador to the Czech Republic.

See also 
 Foreign relations of the Czech Republic
 Foreign relations of Moldova

References

External links 
 The Ministry of Foreign Affairs and European Integration
head of the mission, ambassador of Moldova in Czech Republic
Embassy of the Republic of Moldova to the Czech Republic

 
Moldova
Bilateral relations of Moldova